Junosza is a Polish coat of arms.

Notable bearers
Notable bearers of this coat of arms include:
 Franciszek Bieliński
 House of Borkowski
 House of Karnkowski
 Stanisław Karnkowski
 Jan Karnkowski
 House of Koła
 Barbara Kolanka
 House of Ojrzanowski / Oyrzanowski
 House of Sobański
 Hieronim Radziejowski
 Józef Zaliwski
 House of Załuski
 Marcin Załuski
 Paweł Antoni Załuski
 Louis Bartholomew Załuski
 Andrzej Chryzostom Załuski

Gallery

See also
 Polish heraldry
 Heraldic family
 List of Polish nobility coats of arms

Notes

Bibliography
 Tadeusz Gajl: Herbarz polski od średniowiecza do XX wieku : ponad 4500 herbów szlacheckich 37 tysięcy nazwisk 55 tysięcy rodów. L&L, 2007. .

External links 
  
  

Polish coats of arms